In abstract algebra, a magma, binar, or, rarely, groupoid is a basic kind of algebraic structure. Specifically, a magma consists of a set equipped with a single binary operation that must be closed by definition. No other properties are imposed.

History and terminology 
The term groupoid was introduced in 1927 by Heinrich Brandt describing his Brandt groupoid (translated from the German ). The term was then appropriated by B. A. Hausmann and Øystein Ore (1937) in the sense (of a set with a binary operation) used in this article. In a couple of reviews of subsequent papers in Zentralblatt, Brandt strongly disagreed with this overloading of terminology. The Brandt groupoid is a groupoid in the sense used in category theory, but not in the sense used by Hausmann and Ore. Nevertheless, influential books in semigroup theory, including Clifford and Preston (1961) and Howie (1995) use groupoid in the sense of Hausmann and Ore. Hollings (2014) writes that the term groupoid is "perhaps most often used in modern mathematics" in the sense given to it in category theory.

According to Bergman and Hausknecht (1996): "There is no generally accepted word for a set with a not necessarily associative binary operation. The word groupoid is used by many universal algebraists, but workers in category theory and related areas object strongly to this usage because they use the same word to mean 'category in which all morphisms are invertible'. The term magma was used by Serre [Lie Algebras and Lie Groups, 1965]." It also appears in Bourbaki's .

Definition 

A magma is a set M matched with an operation • that sends any two elements  to another element, . The symbol • is a general placeholder for a properly defined operation. To qualify as a magma, the set and operation  must satisfy the following requirement (known as the magma or closure axiom):

 For all a, b in M, the result of the operation  is also in M.

And in mathematical notation:
 

If • is instead a partial operation, then  is called a partial magma or more often a partial groupoid.

Morphism of magmas 
A morphism of magmas is a function  mapping magma M to magma N that preserves the binary operation:

f (x •M y) = f(x) •N f(y),

where •M and •N denote the binary operation on M and N respectively.

Notation and combinatorics 

The magma operation may be applied repeatedly, and in the general, non-associative case, the order matters, which is notated with parentheses. Also, the operation • is often omitted and notated by juxtaposition:
 

A shorthand is often used to reduce the number of parentheses, in which the innermost operations and pairs of parentheses are omitted, being replaced just with juxtaposition: . For example, the above is abbreviated to the following expression, still containing parentheses:
 
A way to avoid completely the use of parentheses is prefix notation, in which the same expression would be written . Another way, familiar to programmers, is postfix notation (reverse Polish notation), in which the same expression would be written , in which the order of execution is simply left-to-right (no currying).

The set of all possible strings consisting of symbols denoting elements of the magma, and sets of balanced parentheses is called the Dyck language. The total number of different ways of writing  applications of the magma operator is given by the Catalan number .

There are  magmas with  elements, so there are 1, 1, 16, 19683, ...  magmas with 0, 1, 2, 3, 4, ... elements. The corresponding numbers of non-isomorphic magmas are 1, 1, 10, 3330, ...  and the numbers of simultaneously non-isomorphic and non-antiisomorphic magmas are 1, 1, 7, 1734, ... .

Free magma 

A free magma MX on a set X is the "most general possible" magma generated by X (i.e., there are no relations or axioms imposed on the generators; see free object). The binary operation on MX is formed by wrapping each of the two operands in parenthesis and juxtaposing them in the same order. For example:
 
 
 

MX can be described as the set of non-associative words on X with parentheses retained.

It can also be viewed, in terms familiar in computer science, as the magma of binary trees with leaves labelled by elements of X. The operation is that of joining trees at the root. It therefore has a foundational role in syntax.

A free magma has the universal property such that if  is a function from X to any magma N, then there is a unique extension of f to a morphism of magmas f′
 f′ : MX → N.

Types of magma 

Magmas are not often studied as such; instead there are several different kinds of magma, depending on what axioms the operation is required to satisfy. Commonly studied types of magma include:
Quasigroup: A magma where division is always possible.
Loop: A quasigroup with an identity element.
Semigroup: A magma where the operation is associative.
Monoid: A semigroup with an identity element.
Inverse semigroup: A semigroup with inverse. (Also a quasigroup with associativity)
Group: A magma with inverse, associativity, and an identity element.

Note that each of divisibility and invertibility imply the cancellation property.

Magmas with commutativity
Commutative magma: A magma with commutativity.
Commutative monoid: A monoid with commutativity.
Abelian group: A group with commutativity.

Classification by properties 

A magma , with  ∈ , is called

Medial If it satisfies the identity 
Left semimedial If it satisfies the identity 
Right semimedial If it satisfies the identity 
Semimedial If it is both left and right semimedial
Left distributive If it satisfies the identity 
Right distributive If it satisfies the identity 
Autodistributive If it is both left and right distributive
Commutative If it satisfies the identity 
Idempotent If it satisfies the identity 
Unipotent If it satisfies the identity 
Zeropotent If it satisfies the identities 
Alternative If it satisfies the identities  and 
Power-associative If the submagma generated by any element is associative
Flexible if 
A semigroup, or associative If it satisfies the identity 
A left unar If it satisfies the identity 
A right unar If it satisfies the identity 
Semigroup with zero multiplication, or null semigroup If it satisfies the identity 
Unital If it has an identity element
Left-cancellative If, for all , relation  implies 
Right-cancellative If, for all , relation  implies 
Cancellative If it is both right-cancellative and left-cancellative
A semigroup with left zeros If it is a semigroup and it satisfies the identity 
A semigroup with right zeros If it is a semigroup and it satisfies the identity 
Trimedial If any triple of (not necessarily distinct) elements generates a medial submagma
Entropic If it is a homomorphic image of a medial cancellation magma.

Category of magmas 
The category of magmas, denoted Mag, is the category whose objects are magmas and whose morphisms are magma homomorphisms. The category Mag has direct products, and there is an inclusion functor:  as trivial magmas, with operations given by projection .

An important property is that an injective endomorphism can be extended to an automorphism of a magma extension, just the colimit of the (constant sequence of the) endomorphism.

Because the singleton  is the terminal object of Mag, and because Mag is algebraic, Mag is pointed and complete.

See also 
Magma category
Universal algebra
Magma computer algebra system, named after the object of this article.
Commutative magma
Algebraic structures whose axioms are all identities
Groupoid algebra
Hall set

References 

 .
 .
 .

Further reading 
 

Non-associative algebra
Binary operations
Algebraic structures